Samasya is a 1976 Indian Malayalam-language film directed by K. Thankappan. The film stars Madhu, Srividya, Kamal Haasan and Sankaradi in the lead roles. The film has musical score by Shyam and K. P. Udayabhanu.

Cast 

Madhu
Srividya
Kamal Haasan
Sankaradi
Anandavally
Balan K. Nair
Kuthiravattam Pappu
M. G. Soman
Premji
Sangeetha

Production 
Samasya film produced by T. Surendran under production banner Kalaratnam Films. It was given an "U" (Unrestricted) certificate by the Central Board of Film Certification.

Soundtrack 
The music was composed by Shyam and K. P. Udayabhanu and the lyrics were written by P. Bhaskaran, O. N. V. Kurup and Bichu Thirumala.

References

External links 
 

1976 films
1970s Malayalam-language films